Ursula Parker (born July 28, 2003) is an American actress and violinist best known for her role as Jane in the television series Louie. She had prominent roles in the 2015 film Take Me to the River and the 2016 film Spectral.

References

External links
 

Living people
American child actresses
People from Queens, New York
Actresses from New York City
21st-century American actresses
American people of Slovenian descent
Place of birth missing (living people)
2003 births